Robert W. Martin (born October 7, 1969, in Minneapolis, Minnesota) is an American professional basketball player, formerly in the NBA.

Martin, a 7'0" center from the University of Minnesota, played 53 games with the Los Angeles Clippers in 1993-94 and one game in 1994-95, averaging 2.1 points and 2.2 rebounds overall.

External links
NBA statistics @ basketballreference.com
 Personal site @ www.7feet.com

1969 births
Living people
American men's basketball players
Basketball players from Minnesota
Centers (basketball)
Los Angeles Clippers players
Minnesota Golden Gophers men's basketball players
Rapid City Thrillers players
Shreveport Crawdads players
Undrafted National Basketball Association players
Apple Valley High School (Minnesota) alumni